The 2013 Toyota Owners 400 was a NASCAR Sprint Cup Series stock car race that was held on April 27, 2013, at Richmond International Raceway in Richmond, Virginia, United States. Contested over 406 laps-- extended from 400 laps due to a Green-white-checker finish on the 0.75-mile (1.20 km) D-shaped oval, it was the ninth race of the 2013 Sprint Cup Series championship. Kevin Harvick of Richard Childress Racing won the race, his first win of the 2013 season, while Clint Bowyer finished second. Joey Logano, Juan Pablo Montoya, and Jeff Burton rounded out the top five.

Report

Background

The track's turns are banked  at fourteen degrees, while the front stretch, the location of the finish line, is eight degrees. The back stretch, opposite of the front, is at only two degrees. The racetrack has a seating capacity for 94,063 spectators. Kyle Busch was the defending race winner after winning the event four consecutive times, most recently in  2012.

Before the race, Jimmie Johnson was leading the Drivers' Championship with 311 points,  while Kasey Kahne stood in second with 274 points. Brad Keselowski followed in the third position, nine points ahead of Greg Biffle and ten ahead of Dale Earnhardt Jr. in fourth and fifth. Carl Edwards, with 262, was in sixth, five  points ahead of Kyle Busch, Clint Bowyer was seven points ahead of Paul Menard and twenty ahead of Jamie McMurray in ninth and tenth, and 23 ahead of Kevin Harvick in eleventh. Aric Almirola completed the first twelve positions with 222 points.

Practice and qualifying

Two practice sessions were held in preparation for the race; both on Friday, April 26, 2013. The first session lasted for 120 minutes, while second session was 60 minutes long.  During the first practice session, Mark Martin, for the Michael Waltrip Racing team, was quickest ahead of Keselowski in second and Kyle Busch in third. Matt Kenseth was scored fourth, and Brian Vickers managed fifth. Harvick, Edwards, Kurt Busch, Bowyer, and Juan Pablo Montoya rounded out the top ten quickest drivers in the session.

Jeff Gordon was quickest in the second and final practice session, ahead of Montoya in second and Vickers in third. Menard was fourth quickest, and McMurray took fifth. A. J. Allmendinger, Martin Truex Jr., Jeff Burton, Earnhardt Jr., and Edwards followed in the top ten.

During qualifying, forty-three cars were entered. Kenseth clinched his second pole position of the season, with a time of 20.716 seconds. After his qualifying run, Kenseth commented, “It feels great. It’s a great race track. I felt like we were off a little in practice today, and (crew chief) Jason Ratcliff and that whole group there did the things they do for me every week and just made great adjustments. I thought we hit it pretty good there in that lap, had great speed. Thanks to Dollar General, Husky, Home Depot (Kenseth’s sponsors) for sticking with us through all this stuff this week. We’ll get through this ... glad to be on the pole, and looking forward to tomorrow night.”  He was joined on the front row of the grid by Vickers. Gordon qualified third, Kahne took fourth, and Bowyer started fifth. Montoya, Joey Logano, Kyle Busch, Truex Jr., and Mark Martin completed the first ten positions on the grid.

Results

Qualifying

Race results

Standings after the race

Drivers' Championship standings

Manufacturers' Championship standings

Note: Only the first twelve positions are included for the driver standings.

References

Toyota Owners 400
Toyota Owners 400
Toyota Owners 400
NASCAR races at Richmond Raceway